Eric Opoku may refer to:

 Eric Opoku (footballer) (born 1991), Ghanaian footballer
 Eric Opoku (politician) (born 1970), Ghanaian politician